Spamount railway station served Spamount in  County Tyrone in Northern Ireland.

The Castlederg and Victoria Bridge Tramway opened the station on 4 July 1884. It included a passing loop.

The last services operated on 30 January 1933. The staff went on strike on 31 January, and the line never reopened. It closed formally on 17 April 1933.

Routes

References

Disused railway stations in County Tyrone
Railway stations opened in 1884
Railway stations closed in 1933
1884 establishments in Ireland
1933 disestablishments in Northern Ireland
Railway stations in Northern Ireland opened in the 19th century